Vinuesa is a municipality located in the province of Soria, in the autonomous community of Castile and León, Spain. According to the 2004 census (INE), the municipality had a population of 1,031 inhabitants.

Much more information is available on the Spanish Wikipedia page: Vinuesa

References

Municipalities in the Province of Soria